Hāngī is a traditional New Zealand Māori method of cooking food using heated rocks buried in a pit oven, called an umu. It is still used for large groups on special occasions, as it allows large quantities of food to be cooked without the need for commercial cooking appliances.

Process
To "lay a hāngī" or "put down a hāngī" involves digging a pit in the ground, heating stones in the pit with a large fire, placing baskets of food on top of the stones, and covering everything with earth for several hours before uncovering (or lifting) the hāngī. Hāngī "experts" have developed and improved methods that have often, like the stones themselves, been handed down for generations.

Common foods cooked in a hāngī are meats such as lamb, pork, chicken and seafood (kaimoana), and vegetables such as potato, kūmara (sweet potato), yams (oca), pumpkin, squash, taro and cabbage.

Logs, usually mānuka or kānuka, are stacked over the pit with the rocks, commonly andesite or basalt, on top. Once the fire has burned down, the hot embers and most of the ash is removed. Alternatively, the fire is built separately and the hāngī pit is dug while the fire is burning, with the hot rocks transferred to the pit after heating.

Meanwhile, the food is prepared and placed in wire baskets lined with either puka, banana or cabbage leaves, or aluminium foil. The meat basket is placed in the bottom of the pit, with the vegetable basket placed on top. If seafood is included, it is placed on top of the vegetable basket. Wet sacks or cloth are placed on top of the baskets, and the whole pit is covered with earth. The hāngī takes approximately 2.5 to 4 hours to cook. A person supervises the hāngī while it cooks, covering up any escaping steam with earth.

Once the hāngī is cooked, the earth is carefully removed from the top of the pit, followed by the sacks or cloth. The baskets are lifted out of the pit, and the food taken to the kitchen for carving and serving.

Prior to colonisation and the introduction of metals and wire, food was laid between bark, large leaves and other vegetation. Wire baskets became widely used in the early 19th century, with sacking and cloth replacing leaves and bark as the covering of choice.  

In the early 21st century, gas-heated stainless-steel "hāngī machines" are sometimes used to replicate the style of cooking without the need for a wood fire, rocks and a pit.

Early umu-tī 
Evidence from early Polynesian settler sites in New Zealand such as Wairau Bar and in coastal Otago Peninsula from about 1280 shows a significant number of large cooking pits or umu which were designed to cook tī kōuka or various other species of Cordyline. 

The distinguishing feature of an umu-tī was its large size compared to a normal earth oven. The long, carrot-shaped tap root was cooked in a large, stone-lined pit for between one and two days. The result was a fibrous mass of sweet pulp with a bitter aftertaste.  This was a common east Polynesian practice in the Cook Islands and Society Islands, and the remains of large umu have also been found in the Kermadec Islands. Investigation in Otago shows that most of these pits were used only once or twice.

See also 
Clam bake
Curanto
Kālua
Lovo
Pachamanca
Rosvopaisti

References

External links
 Home-cooked Hangi in the UK

Māori cuisine
New Zealand cuisine
Earth oven
Māori words and phrases
Communal eating